is the theatrical film adaptation of the Japanese 2008 Super Sentai series Engine Sentai Go-onger.

As with all of the Super Sentai films, Boom Boom! Bang Bang! GekijōBang!! is a double bill with the film for the 2008 Kamen Rider series Kamen Rider Kiva, Kamen Rider Kiva: King of the Castle in the Demon World. Both films premiered in Japanese theaters on August 9, 2008. The film features guest star J-pop singer Sonim, portraying the antagonist Empress Maki.

Plot
The film begins as Gaiark Pollution Ministers attempt to break the dimensional barriers that separate the Braneworlds, recycling 13 Barbaric Machine Beasts to help them out. The Go-ongers intercept the Recycle Barbaric Machine Beast Army in their Engines, managing to scrap the 13. Attempting to find the missing Engine Casts of Speedor, Bus-on and BearRV while Jumboale and Carrigator work hard to keep the portal between the two worlds open, the Go-ongers pursue the Honōshū.

After escaping a group of Samurai, the primary Go-ongers run for their lives before being saved by Tsuki-no-Wa, who brings them to the others. But Raiken and Gokumaru arrive with Hant and Gunpei after taking Birc and Gunpherd's Engine Souls, forcing the Honōshū to reveal themselves as Engine Souls. However, they are unable to bond with the primary Engine Casts with the Yōma taking them. After learning the Honōshū's story, the Go-ongers offer their aid in storming Maki's castle the day, finding the Sutō siblings who pretend to work for Maki in order to return the Engine Casts to them.

As the others destroy Maki's Yōma servants with Hyper Cannonball to get back Shishi-no-Shin & Tsuki-no-Wa's Engine Casts, Go-on Red is overwhelmed by Maki until the Honōshū arrive. However, with Engine-Oh and the other Engines fighting Maki in her monstrous form before being broken down. But Sōsuke manages to grab on to one of Maki's heads, fighting his way to Retsu-Taka's Engine Cast. Once getting the Engine Cast, Maki assumes her true form as the Honōshū risk themselves to form Engine Daishougun with Sōsuke piloting them to destroy Maki and burn her castle to the ground. With the battle over, as Samurai World's denizens return to normal, Engine Daishogun turns to stone much to Sōsuke's dismay. The Go-on teams soon return to their world.

Internet spin-off film
On June 2, 2008, Toei announced on its various official websites that there would be a series of short five-minute internet movies that are spin-offs of both King of the Castle in the Demon World and Boom Boom! Bang Bang! GekijōBang!! to be accessed by a mobile phone service. In the case of Boom Boom! Bang Bang! GekijōBang!!, the featurettes are called , released on July 11, 2008. In "Bom Bom! Bom Bom! Net de Bong", the Gaiark Pollution Ministers begin setting up their plan break the dimensional barriers that separate the Braneworlds in order to create their Gaiark haven, setting up the opening sequences for the actual movie. However, while the Go-ongers are trapped in Samurai World, the Ministers attempt to take advantage of the event by subduing Bomper, who battles them personally when they attempt to set a trap for the Go-ongers as they return to their dimension.

Webisodes

Cast
Sōsuke Esumi: 
Renn Kōsaka: 
Saki Rōyama: 
Hant Jō: 
Gunpei Ishihara: 
Hiroto Sutō: 
Miu Sutō: 
Kegalesia, Landlady: 
Empress Maki: 
Retsu-Taka: .
Shishi-no-Shin: 
Tsuki-no-Wa: 
Samurai:

Voice actors
Speedor: 
Bus-on: 
BearRV: 
Birca: 
Gunpherd: 
Carrigator: 
Toripter: 
Jetras: 
Jum-bowhale: 
Bomper: 
Yogostein, Ronin: 
Kitaneidas, Young Samurai: 
Raiken: 
Gokumaru:

Songs
Opening theme

Lyrics: Mike Sugiyama
Composition: Takafumi Iwasaki
Artist: Hideyuki Takahashi (Project. R)
Ending theme
*
Lyrics: Mike Sugiyama
Composition & Arrangement: Kenichiro Ōishi
Artist: Project. R (Takayoshi Tanimoto, Hideaki Takatori, Sister MAYO, Hideyuki Takahashi, Takafumi Iwasaki, YOFFY, Mayumi Gojo, Kenichiro Ōishi) with Engine Kids
"Engine Formation Rap -GekijōBang! Custom-" was also used as the ending theme for episode 25 of the series.

References

External links
Kiva-Go.jp - Official movie website hub 
Engine Sentai Go-onger: Boom Boom! Bang Bang! GekijōBang!! - Official movie website 

2008 films
2000s Japanese-language films
2000s Super Sentai films